Eriocephalus klinghardtensis is a species of flowering plant in the family Asteraceae.

Information
Eriocephalus klinghardtensis is found only in Namibia. The natural habitat of this species is rocky areas. The population trend of this species is also at a stable rate with no recorded threats that could negatively affect the species in a dramatic way. The habitat of Eriocephalus klinghardtensis can be found in terrestrial systems. It is a part of the compositae. They can also be found on inland cliffs and mountain peaks. Eriocephalus klinghardtensis is recorded to be found in about 510 subpopulations.

References

klinghardtensis
Flora of Namibia
Least concern plants
Taxonomy articles created by Polbot